Sigourney Weaver is an American actress who began her career in the early 1970s by appearing in plays. Throughout her career, she has acted in nearly 40 stage productions. She made her film debut with a minor role in Woody Allen's comedy-drama Annie Hall (1977), but her breakthrough came when she portrayed Ellen Ripley in  Ridley Scott's science fiction film Alien (1979). She reprised the role in Aliens (1986), this time helmed by director James Cameron. Her performance netted her a nomination for the Academy Award for Best Actress. She returned to the role in two more sequels: Alien 3 (1992) and Alien Resurrection (1997), neither of which were as well received. Although originally written as a male role, Ripley is now regarded as one of the most significant female protagonists in cinema history, and consequently, Weaver is considered to be a pioneer of action heroines in science fiction films.

Although best known for her role in the Alien franchise, Weaver has fostered a prolific filmography, appearing in more than 60 films. In 1981, she starred alongside William Hurt in the neo-noir  Eyewitness. Her next role was opposite Mel Gibson in the Peter Weir–directed The Year of Living Dangerously (1982). She played Dana Barrett in Ghostbusters (1984), later returning to the franchise in Ghostbusters II (1989), Ghostbusters (2016), and Ghostbusters: Afterlife (2021). In 1986, Weaver starred opposite Michael Caine in the erotic thriller Half Moon Street. Her next role was primatologist Dian Fossey in Gorillas in the Mist (1988), for which she won a Golden Globe Award for Best Actress in a Motion Picture – Drama. That same year, she also won the Golden Globe Award for Best Supporting Actress – Motion Picture for her performance alongside Harrison Ford in Working Girl. Weaver was the first actor to have two acting wins at the Golden Globes in the same year. She also received an Academy Award nomination for both films.

In 1992, Weaver collaborated with Ridley Scott again, portraying Queen Isabella in 1492: Conquest of Paradise. Two years later, she appeared in the Roman Polanski–directed Death and the Maiden, in a major role opposite Ben Kingsley. Her performance in the Ang Lee–directed The Ice Storm (1997) garnered her a BAFTA Award for Best Actress in a Supporting Role. She next appeared in the science-fiction comedy Galaxy Quest (1999) alongside Tim Allen and Alan Rickman. She then portrayed socialite Babe Paley alongside an ensemble cast in Infamous (2006). In 2009, Weaver reteamed with James Cameron on Avatar, which remained the highest-grossing film of all time for a decade, portraying Dr. Grace Augustine. She will return for multiple Avatar sequels, which are scheduled to be released throughout the 2020s, portraying the Na'vi Kiri te Suli Kìreysì'ite, while reprising her original role as Augustine in a cameo in Avatar: The Way of Water (2022). She worked with Tim Allen again on the comedy Crazy on the Outside (2010). In 2014, she collaborated with Scott for a third time on Exodus: Gods and Kings, in which she played Tuya.

Weaver has done extensive voiceover work and has had multiple roles in animated films, including  The Tale of Despereaux (2008) and Pixar films WALL-E (2008) and Finding Dory (2016). She has narrated or appeared in 14 documentaries, such as the BBC series Planet Earth (2006) and The Beatles: Eight Days a Week (2016). Weaver has also lent her voice to three audio-books, four film soundtracks, and two video games: James Cameron's Avatar: The Game (2009) and Alien: Isolation (2014). Weaver has also voice acted on the television shows Futurama, Penn Zero: Part-Time Hero, and SpongeBob SquarePants, among others.

Film

Television

Theatre

Documentaries

Video games

Audio books

Soundtrack discography

See also
List of awards and nominations received by Sigourney Weaver

Notes

References

External links
Sigourney Weaver filmography on IMDb
Sigourney Weaver at the Rotten Tomatoes
Sigourney Weaver on TV Guide

Actress filmographies
American filmographies